Rafael Motta Bacêllo Mósca (born 13 May 1982, in Rio de Janeiro) is a freestyle swimmer from Brazil.

Trying to prevent some respiratory problem, Mósca began to practice swimming. His mother enrolled him in a swim school at two years of age. At 11, a disease in kidney removed him from swimming pools, for a year and a half. Recovered, returned to swim at Flamengo. The first good results of Rafael appeared, and he began to consider the possibility of a career as a professional athlete.

At 19 years old, he broke the 10-year hegemony of Gustavo Borges in the 200-metre freestyle, at the 2002 Jose Finkel Trophy (Brazilian Short Course Championship). Gustavo won the gold medal since 1992.

Mósca swam at the 2002 Pan Pacific Swimming Championships, where he finished 4th in the 4×100-metre freestyle, 5th in the 4×200-metre freestyle, and 14th in the 200-metre freestyle.

At the 2003 World Aquatics Championships, in Barcelona, Mósca finished 33rd in the 200-metre freestyle  and 9th in the 4×200-metre freestyle.

He won the silver medal with the men's relay team in the 4×200-metre freestyle at the 2003 Pan American Games in Santo Domingo, Dominican Republic. His winning teammates were Carlos Jayme, Gustavo Borges, and Rodrigo Castro. He also finished 7th in the 200-metre freestyle.

Mósca also represented his native country at the 2004 Summer Olympics in Athens, Greece. In which he achieved 9th place also with the men's relay team in the 4×200-metre freestyle, now with Bruno Bonfim, Carlos Jayme and Rodrigo Castro. At this race, he broke the South American record, with a time of 7:22.70.

At the 2004 FINA World Swimming Championships (25 m) in Indianapolis, Mósca won the bronze medal in the 4×200-metre freestyle, along with Rodrigo Castro, Thiago Pereira and Lucas Salatta, beating the South American record, with a time of 7:06.64. He also finished 19th in the 200-metre freestyle.

References
 Folha Online
 UOL profile

External links 
 
 

1982 births
Living people
Olympic swimmers of Brazil
Swimmers at the 2003 Pan American Games
Swimmers at the 2004 Summer Olympics
Brazilian male freestyle swimmers
Medalists at the FINA World Swimming Championships (25 m)
Pan American Games silver medalists for Brazil
Pan American Games medalists in swimming
Medalists at the 2003 Pan American Games
Swimmers from Rio de Janeiro (city)
20th-century Brazilian people
21st-century Brazilian people